KFML may refer to:

 KFML (FM), a radio station (94.1 FM) licensed to Little Falls, Minnesota, United States
 Communist Party of Sweden (1967), originally named Kommunistiska Förbundet Marxist-Leninisterna 
 Communist League Marxist-Leninists (Denmark) (Kommunistiske Forbundet Marxist-Leninisterne), a Danish communist organization